Xylomya is a fly genus in the family Xylomyidae, the "wood soldier flies".

Species

Xylomya alamaculata Yang & Nagatomi, 1993
Xylomya americana (Wiedemann, 1821)
Xylomya aterrima Johnson, 1903
Xylomya chekiangensis (Ôuchi, 1938)
Xylomya ciscaucasica (Pleske, 1928)
Xylomya czekanovskii (Pleske, 1925)
Xylomya czekanovskii ssp. tuvensis Krivosheina, 1999
Xylomya decora Yang & Nagatomi, 1993
Xylomya elongata (Osten Sacken, 1886)
Xylomya galloisi (Séguy, 1956)
Xylomya gracilicorpus Yang & Nagatomi, 1993
Xylomya maculata (Meigen, 1804)
Xylomya matsumurai (Nagatomi & Tanaka, 1971)
Xylomya mlokosiewczi (Pleske, 1925)
Xylomya moratula Cockerell, 1914
Xylomya pallidifemur Malloch, 1917
Xylomya parens (Williston, 1885)
Xylomya sauteri (James, 1939)
Xylomya shcherbakovi Mostovski, 1999
Xylomya shikokuana (Miyatake, 1965)
Xylomya sichuanensis Yang & Nagatomi, 1993
Xylomya simillima Steyskal, 1947
Xylomya sinica Yang & Nagatomi, 1993
Xylomya sordida (Pleske, 1928)
Xylomya tenthredinoides (Wulp, 1867)
Xylomya terminalis Vasey, 1977
Xylomya trinotata (Bigot, 1880)
Xylomya wenxiana Yang, Gao & An, 1995
Xylomya xixiana Yang, Gao & An, 2002
Xylomya yasumatsui (Nagatomi & Tanaka, 1971)
Xylomya zhelochovtsevi Krivosheina, 1999
Xylomyia longicornis Matsumura, 1915
Xylomyia luteicornis Frey, 1960
Xylomyia moiwana Matsumura, 1915
Xylomyia prista Enderlein, 1913
Xylomyia semimaculata Frey, 1960

References

Xylomyidae
Brachycera genera
Taxa named by Camillo Rondani
Diptera of North America
Diptera of Europe
Diptera of Asia